The 2007 West Virginia Mountaineers football team began play on September 1, 2007. The team was coached by Rich Rodriguez until he announced on December 16, 2007, that he was leaving West Virginia to coach the Michigan Wolverines.  The head coaching position remained vacant after his announcement, with assistant head coach Bill Stewart serving as interim head coach.  Stewart was then named head coach on January 3, 2008, after leading the Mountaineers to victory in the 2008 Fiesta Bowl over the #3 Oklahoma Sooners.  West Virginia played their home games on Mountaineer Field at Milan Puskar Stadium in Morgantown, West Virginia.

Preseason

New uniforms
West Virginia unveiled a new gold uniform with blue stripes design for the season. The tops have been featured with both blue and gold bottoms. The uniform is currently being featured as the alternate home uniform. Running back Steve Slaton sported the uniform when he attended the 2007 Playboy All-American honoring at the Playboy Mansion at the beginning of the preseason wearing it with white bottoms.

Spring practice
West Virginia started spring practice on March 5. Mountaineer fans got an opportunity to get a first look at the 2007 football team during the annual Gold-Blue Game, which was held at Mountaineer Field on Saturday, April 7 at 12:30 p.m.. The offense won the contest 58–30, with the only touchdown being a 46-yard pass from Adam Bednarik to Wes Lyons. Backup running back Eddie Davis produced the most impressive performance.

The major goals of spring practice were to improve the defense, find a solid backup for running back Steve Slaton, and work out the inexperienced class of receivers. The Mountaineers also needed to replace the center position, where All-American Dan Mozes left as a senior, and the guard position.

Recruiting class
The Mountaineers received 25 letters of intent on National Signing Day, February 7, 2007. Florida all-purpose back Noel Devine created some controversy when he reported to the news that he had chosen West Virginia over Alabama. But on National Signing Day, Devine never signed his letter of intent, saying that after having a talk with mentor Deion Sanders, he decided to wait to see his SAT scores. He was most likely going to pursue a prep school season, then return to the recruiting scene for 2008. Noel then received word he had passed his tests, and so signed his LOI to attend WVU. In the preseason, Devine was named one of the top 10 impact freshman for 2007.  An additional recruit, LB Pat Lazear, was signed on February 16, 2007.

Rankings

Schedule

Game summaries

Western Michigan

The Mountaineers put up the most points since 2001 against Rutgers (80–7 win) when they defeated the Broncos 62–24. Pat White put up two rushing (97 total yards) and two passing touchdowns (196 total yards) while Steve Slaton rushed for 109 yards and 3 touchdowns, while also catching a 58-yard touchdown pass from White. Freshman sensation Noel Devine scored his first touchdown of his career, while also rushing for 44 yards. Darius Reynaud had 92 yards receiving on 5 catches. The team wore traditional blue jerseys with gold pants

Marshall

The Mountaineers traveled to Huntington, for the first time in over 90 years and got off to a slow start in losing 13–6 at halftime, but Steve Slaton's two touchdowns and 146 yards helped the Mountaineers pull out the win to capture the Governors Trophy. Pat White went 13 of 18 for 149 yards and two touchdowns, also rushing for 125 yards and a score. Freshman Noel Devine rushed for a touchdown and 76 yards on only five carries as well. The team wore all white uniforms

Maryland

Freshman running back Noel Devine stole the spotlight from Patrick White and Steve Slaton as he rushed for 136 yards on only 5 carries. Slaton rushed for 137 yards and 3 touchdowns, while White had an off day of 95 yards passing and one rushing touchdown. This marked the 4th straight win over rival Maryland. The team wore white jerseys and blue pants

East Carolina

The Mountaineers had their most complete game of the season as they almost pitched a shutout. The Pirates scored with less than a minute left in the game against the second-team defense, but the Mountaineers only allowed 160 total yards on the day. Pat White went 18 for 20 (90% completion percentage set a school record) for 181 yards and two touchdowns and rushed for two more scores. Steve Slaton rushed for 110 yards and a touchdown, which tied a school record for most career rushing touchdowns (42). Darius Reynaud, who played with a shoulder injury, had two touchdown receptions and a 64-yard run. Linebacker Mortty Ivy helped the defense out with an interception and a forced fumble. The team wore all blue uniforms

South Florida

In front of an expected record-breaking crowd at Raymond James Stadium, the Mountaineers were defeated by the #18 South Florida Bulls. WVU committed 6 turnovers during the game and starting QB Pat White didn't play in the second half. The team wore all white.

Syracuse

The Mountaineers rebounded in a big way by trouncing the Orange to win the Ben Schwartzwalder Trophy despite losing quarterback Pat White to a chest muscle strain and running back Steve Slaton to only 69 yards rushing. The team wore traditional white jerseys with gold pants

Mississippi State

The Mountaineers jumped to an early 28–0 lead by the end of the 1st quarter and cruised to a 38–13 win. This marked the first game for the new gold jerseys, which were worn with blue pants

Rutgers

Rutgers was expected to perform well against West Virginia, since the Scarlet Knights had previously beaten #2 ranked South Florida. Steve Slaton led the way with 3 rushing touchdowns against #25(AP) Rutgers in WVU's 13th straight win over the Scarlet Knights. Ray Rice rushed for 142 yards breaking a Rutgers school record for most 100+ yard games. The team wore all white

Louisville

By halftime West Virginia had a 21–14 lead. Louisville was able to take advantage of the Mountaineer's mistakes(WVU had 3 turnovers and 11 penalties for 116 yards) and were able to spark a comeback but West Virginia broke the 31–31 tie when Pat White ran for a 50 yd TD with a little over a minute to play. Brian Brohm was intercepted in the final seconds of the game ending Louisville's attempt to tie the game and send it into overtime. The team wore all gold uniforms, and most of the crowd also wore gold.

Cincinnati

For the second straight game West Virginia made a double-digit second-half lead interesting by coughing up the football. And for the second straight game the Mountaineers were able to hold on for a victory by defeating No. 21 Cincinnati 28–23 to keep its Big East title hopes alive. Pat White finished the game with 295 yards of total offense, rushing 27 times for 155 yards and two touchdowns and completing 13 of 19 passes for 140 yards. Sophomore safety Boogie Allen recovered a Cincinnati onside kick to save the Mountaineers' win. The team wore white jerseys and blue pants.

Connecticut

West Virginia rushed for 517 yards(415 of which came in the second half) and clinched their 5th Big East title with 66–21 win over UConn. Pat White went 9/13 passing for 107 yards and a TD, as well as rushing for a season high 186 yards 16 on carries and 2 TDs. Freshman RB Noel Devine also added 118 yards on the ground with a TD. Steve Slaton also went over the 1,000 yard mark on the season for the 3rd straight year. The win clinched the Big East automatic Bowl Championship Series berth, and coupled with the previous day's upset over then #1 LSU by unranked Arkansas, put the Mountaineers in a position to play for a berth in National Championship game with a win over rival Pitt the next week. The team wore traditional blue jerseys and gold pants.

Pittsburgh

WVU entered the game against Pitt as 28 point favorites to win the 100th Backyard Brawl and earn a berth in the BCS championship game. The Mountaineers, however, could never get their high-powered offense going against the Panthers and were hurt by fumbles, missed field goals, and ineffective performances by Steve Slaton and Pat White, the latter of whom missed part of the game with a thumb injury. Pittsburgh, starting their backup QB Pat Bostick, was equally ineffective at moving the ball outside of the play of LeSean McCoy. Trailing by one possession late in the fourth quarter, West Virginia twice had the ball in Pitt territory, with both drives ending in Pat White being stopped on downs. The final Pitt possession saw the Panthers run the ball out of the back of the end zone for a safety as the clock expired, ending WVU's National Championship hopes.

Fiesta Bowl: Oklahoma

WVU entered the game as 7-point underdogs to the #3 Oklahoma Sooners, who were thought by some to be the best team in the country. Former head coach Rich Rodriguez had recently taken the head coaching position at the University of Michigan, leaving West Virginia with interim head coach Bill Stewart. West Virginia halfback Steve Slaton was taken out of the game early on with a hamstring injury, leaving the Mountaineers with freshman Noel Devine. West Virginia scored early with two field goals by Pat McAfee to take the lead, 6–0, into the second quarter. Sam Bradford was intercepted by Mountaineer safety Quinton Andrews early on, but the Sooners bounced back with a field goal to make it 6–3. However, fullback Owen Schmitt led the Mountaineers to their first touchdown on a 57-yard run to make the score 13–3. Oklahoma returned with a field goal to make it 13–6, but West Virginia ended the first half with a pass from their star quarterback, Pat White to a wide-open Darius Reynaud for a 21-yard touchdown to make it 20–6 at halftime. Linebacker Reed Williams won the Defensive MVP award, while backup linebacker J.T. Thomas recorded 6 tackles.

Oklahoma came back in the second half early with a field goal, followed by a goal line touchdown run by Chris Brown. The Sooners went for a 2-point conversion after the touchdown, but Bradford's pass was incomplete, leaving the score at 20–15. The Mountaineers answered back with a 17-yard run by Noel Devine for the touchdown to put the Mountaineers up 27–15. The Mountaineers scored again to end the third quarter, this time on a 30-yard reverse run by Darius Reynaud, to put the Mountaineers up 34–15 going into the fourth quarter. The Sooners scored early again, off of a Bradford pass to Quentin Chaney, but yet again failed a 2-point conversion attempt. West Virginia continued to roll however, as White hooked up with receiver Tito Gonzales for a 79-yard touchdown pass to put the Mountaineers up 41–21. The pass was the longest play in West Virginia school bowl history. Oklahoma scored again on a Bradford pass, this time to Juaquin Iglesias, but this time kicked the extra point to make the score 41–28. The Mountaineers sealed the game with six minutes left on a 65-yard touchdown run by Noel Devine, his second score of the game.

The West Virginia Mountaineers totaled 349 rushing yards in the victory. Pat White totaled 176 yards and two touchdowns passing while rushing for 150 yards. Noel Devine rushed for 108 yards and two touchdowns on only 13 carries, while Owen Schmitt totaled 64 yards and a score on three carries. Sam Bradford recorded 242 yards, two touchdowns, and an interception passing for the Sooners. Allen Patrick rushed for 82 yards on 14 carries, while Chris Brown rushed for 50 yards and a score on 16 carries. Quentin Chaney grabbed 4 passes for 129 yards and a score while receiver Juaquin Iglesias returned seven kicks for 195 yards.

References

West Virginia
West Virginia Mountaineers football seasons
Fiesta Bowl champion seasons
Big East Conference football champion seasons
Lambert-Meadowlands Trophy seasons
West Virginia Mountaineers football